Fitzrichard is a Hiberno-Norman surname. It is patronymic as the prefix Fitz- derives from the Latin filius, meaning "son of". Its variants include the alternate forms FitzRichard, fitz Richard and Fitz Richard, and the given name turned surname Richard or Richards. Fitzrichard is rare as a given name.  People with the name Fitzrichard include the brothers:

 Gilbert Fitz Richard (1065-1115), English peer
 Robert Fitz Richard (1064-1136), English landowner

See also
 Fitz
 Richard

Norman-language surnames
Patronymic surnames
Surnames from given names